Forrest Hibbits (born 1905) was a mid-century fine artist and watercolorist. He was born in Lompoc, California, on October 9, 1905. He left the Hibbits family ranch to attend the California College of Arts and Crafts and graduated ca. 1927. He taught at the San Francisco Art Institute. Hibbits was married to fellow artist Marie Jaans, whom he met in North Beach. He created a poster for the 1939 World's Fair (Golden Gate International Exposition on Treasure Island in San Francisco. Hibbits worked  as a commercial illustrator along with fellow artist Clyde Follet Seavey at Patterson and Sullivan in San Francisco.  Marie and Forrest moved from San Francisco back to the  Lompoc/Santa Ynez Valley area in the 1940s after Hibbits joined the Army, and lived there for the rest of their lives. Later, he taught at the Santa Barbara Art Institute.   
Hibbits worked in many styles, including nudes, representational landscapes, surreal scenes, semi-abstract and abstract works.  He sold his work in a small store front adjacent to his studio in Buellton called  "La Petite Gallerie" from the 1950s until the late 1980s.

Exhibitions
San Francisco Museum of Art
De Young Museum
Oakland Museum of Art
Palace of the Legion of Honor

Permanent collections 
Santa Barbara Museum of Art
Long Beach Museum of Art

References

Hughes, Edan Milton. "HIBBITS, Forrest." Artists in California, 1786-1940. Sacramento, CA: Crocker Art Museum, 2002. Print.
Brierton, Peggy. "About Forrest Hibbits." Zaca Creek Art Gallery. 2009. Web. 04 Feb. 2011. <http://www.zacacreekartgallery.com/hibbits-bio.php>.
AskART. "Forrest Hibbits - Artist, Fine Art, Auction Records, Prices, Biography for Forrest Hibbits." AskART. 2000-2011. Web. 04 Feb. 2011. <http://www.askart.com/askart/artist.aspx?artist=3058>.

1905 births
American watercolorists
American illustrators
1996 deaths
20th-century American painters
American male painters
20th-century American male artists